Agami is a city in Egypt.

Agami may also refer to:
 Agami (film), a 1984 Bangladeshi film
 Agami heron, a species of heron in Central America, Peru, and Brazil
 Agami Systems, a network storage company headquartered in Sunnyvale, California

People with the surname
 Al Agami, rapper who led Los Umbrellos
 Moshe Agami, Israeli  former football player